Tylenchorhynchus claytoni (Tobacco stunt nematode, tessellate stylet nematode) is a plant pathogenic nematode.

References

Further reading

External links 
 Nemaplex, University of California - Tylenchorhynchus claytoni

Agricultural pest nematodes
Tylenchida